Fahd Mohamad Saleh (born 3 April 1985 in Homs, Syria) is a Syrian football goalkeeper. He played for Al-Asalah in the Jordan League Division 1.
On 8 October 2017 he signed for The Prince Charles Sunday League Team who play in the Mansfield Division 3 in England. Goalkeeping Coach for AFC Mansfield club in England season 2019 - 2020.

References

1985 births
Living people
Sportspeople from Homs
Association football goalkeepers
Syrian footballers
Syrian expatriate footballers
Syrian expatriate sportspeople in Jordan
Expatriate footballers in Jordan
Al-Karamah players
Syrian Premier League players